is a railway station on the West Japan Railway Company (JR West) Osaka Higashi Line in Hirano-ku, Osaka Prefecture, Japan.  The station is not treated as "" for JR tickets.

Layout
There are two side platforms with two tracks elevated.

History
The station was initially planned under the provisional name . However, since there is a separate Kami Station on the Yamatoji Line, the definite name Shin-Kami was assigned.

August 23, 2007 – Press release by JR West of the determination of the station name as Shin-Kami
March 15, 2008 – Opening of the station

Adjacent stations

References

Hirano-ku, Osaka
Railway stations in Osaka
Stations of West Japan Railway Company
Railway stations in Japan opened in 2008